Imran Maharoof (born 1 September 1983) is a Sri Lankan politician, former provincial councillor and Member of Parliament.

Early life
Maharoof was born on 1 September 1983. He is the son of former MP M. E. H. Maharoof. He is a cousin of former MP M. A. M. Maharoof (Sinna Maharoof). He was educated at Royal College, Colombo and holds a diploma in management and banking.

Career
Maharoof contested the 2010 parliamentary election as one of the United National Front (UNF) electoral alliance's candidates in Trincomalee District but failed to get elected after coming 2nd amongst the UNF candidates. He contested the 2012 provincial council election as one of the United National Party's candidates in Trincomalee District and was elected to the Eastern Provincial Council.

Maharoof the 2015 parliamentary election as one of the United National Front for Good Governance electoral alliance's candidates in Trincomalee District and was elected to the Parliament of Sri Lanka. He was re-elected at the 2020 parliamentary election.

Electoral history

References

External links
 

1983 births
Alumni of Royal College, Colombo
Living people
Members of the 15th Parliament of Sri Lanka
Members of the 16th Parliament of Sri Lanka
Members of the Eastern Provincial Council
People from Eastern Province, Sri Lanka
Samagi Jana Balawegaya politicians
Sri Lankan Moor politicians
Sri Lankan Muslims
United National Party politicians